Raiamas kheeli is a species of cyprinid fish in the genus Raiamas from the Democratic Republic of the Congo.

References 

Raiamas
Fish described in 2006
Endemic fauna of the Democratic Republic of the Congo